This article displays the qualifying draw of the 2011 Poli-Farbe Budapest Grand Prix.

Players

Seeds

Qualifiers

Lucky losers
  Anna-Giulia Remondina

Qualifying draw

First qualifier

Second qualifier

Third qualifier

Fourth qualifier

References
 Qualifying Draw

2011 - qualifying
Poli-Farbe Budapest Grand Prix - qualifying